Prättigau/Davos Region is one of the eleven administrative districts in the canton of Graubünden in Switzerland. It was created on 1 January 2017 as part of a reorganization of the Canton replacing the Prättigau/Davos District.

History
The Prättigau is a popular tourist destination for winter and summer activities, including downhill and cross country skiing, tobogganing and hiking.

Traditionally, towns in the Prättigau were reliant on the lumber industry, although the income from tourism has largely replaced that.

The historical American Van Leer family claims linage from this area through Swiss archives.

Demographics

References

Regions of Graubünden